The Ganguly family in Bollywood is referred as the Hindu Bengali Brahmin family hailing from Madhya Pradesh. 
In a Bollywood film industry dominated by powerhouse families the Ganguly brothers and their family connections serve as an important bridge between the clans.

Brief history of the Ganguly family 

The Ganguly family are a family of film personalities active in the Hindi film industry. The family comprises the descendants of three brothers - Ashok Kumar Ganguly, Anoop Kumar Ganguly and Kishore Kumar Ganguly - and their sister Sati Rani Mukherjee.

The history of the Ganguly family begins with Kunjalal Ganguly, an advocate by profession coming from a long line of lawyers, and his wife Gouri Rani Devi, the grand-daughter of Raja Shibchandra Banerjee and sister of classical singer Dhananjay Banerjee. The celebrated brothers and their sister, who gave birth to the Mukherjee's of Bollywood, were born to these two. Supposedly, Kishore Kumar inherited his sense of comedy from Kunjalal. Also, the most popular film featuring all three Ganguly brothers – Chalti Ka Naam Gaadi – was, supposedly, inspired by Kunjalal's Chrysler that he bought in 1928, a year before the birth of his youngest son.

If Rattan Bai from their extended family network is ignored, Ashok Kumar was the first person in the family to go into the film industry. His daughter Preeti Ganguly, son-in-law Deven Verma (married to his elder daughter Rupa Ganguly) and granddaughter Anuradha Patel also became accomplished actors. Ashok Kumar's son Aroop Kumar Ganguly never joined the film industry.

Kishore Kumar's wives
Kishore Kumar was married to Ruma Guha Thakurta (1950–58), Madhubala (1960–69), Yogeeta Bali (1975–78) and Leena Chandavarkar (1980–87). They were divorced in 1958, and Ruma later remarried.
Ruma (now, Ruma Guha Thakurta) was the daughter of Satyen Ghosh (better known as Montey Ghosh) and a niece to Smt. Bijoya Roy, the wife of the legendary film director Satyajit Ray (son of writer Sukumar Ray and grandson of writer and publisher Upendrakishore Raychowdhury). Her mother Sati Devi, a talented singer, was the elder sister of Bijoya, the legendary director's wife. Amit Kumar, her son with Kishore Kumar eventually became a celebrity in his own right. Amit later sang duets with Krishna Mukherjee, a niece to his paternal aunt Satirani.

His second wife, Madhubala (Mumtaz Jehan Begum Dehlavi) was blamed by his family for the breakup with the first wife. Madhubala was often sick and died on 23 February 1969 at an early age. 

Yogeeta was a niece to Geeta Bali, who in turn was Shammi Kapoor's first wife. Kishore's second son Sumit Kumar was born to Leena and is also a singer. Ruma later married Arup Guha Thakurta and had a son, Ayan, and a daughter, Sromana, with him. Shammi Kapoor, a scion of the Kapoor family and Geeta Bali's daughter Kanchan Desai married Ketan Desai, son of director Manmohan Desai, who was engaged to actress Nanda (actor-director Master Vinayak's daughter) before his death.

Yogeeta eventually divorced Kishore Kumar and married Mithun Chakravorty, who married Sridevi for a brief stint. Sridevi later married producer Surinder Kapoor's son Boney Kapoor, a producer who has two famous actors for brothers – Anil Kapoor and Sanjay Kapoor. Surinder, on the other hand, began his career as Geeta Bali's secretary. His only daughter, Reena, is married to showbiz tycoon Sandeep Marwah. Satyajit and Bijoya's son Sandip Ray is an accomplished film director.

Sati Devi
The only sister of the famous Ganguly brothers, Sati Devi, was married to Sashadhar Mukherjee (brother of Ravindramohan Mukherjee, Subodh Mukherjee and Prabodh Mukherjee) of the Mukherjee-Samarth family. She gave birth to director and composer Rono Mukherjee (father of actress Sharbani Mukherjee), actors Joy Mukherjee (father of actor Boy Mukherjee) & Deb Mukherjee (father of director Ayan Mukerji), directors & producers Shomu Mukherjee (husband of actress Tanuja and father of actresses Kajol and Tanishaa Mukerji) & Shubhir Mukherjee, and Shibani Mukherjee. Kajol, in turn, is married to actor Ajay Devgan, the son of fight choreographer Veeru Devgan.

Bharti Jaffery
Bharti Jaffery was the daughter of Ashok Kumar. Actress Kiara Advani is the step-granddaughter of Bharathi Jaffrey, thus making Advani the step great-granddaughter of Ashok Kumar. Bharti and Kiara are also related to Saeed Jaffery, who was the uncle-by-marriage of Bharti and great-uncle of Kiara. Bharti's daughter and Kiara's aunt, Shaheen Jaffrey, is a model.

Extended family
Actresses Rani Mukherjee (granddaughter of Ravindramohan Mukherjee and daughter of director Ram Mukherjee and singer Krishna Mukherjee), and actor Mohnish Behl come from the extended Mukherjee-Samarth family. The film involvement of the clan began with actress Rattan Bai, mother of actress Shobhna Samarth, aunt to actress Nalini Jaywant and grandmother of actresses Tanuja and Nutan. Reportedly, music director Bappi Lahiri is also in the Mukherjee's extended family tree. Actress Chhaya Devi was first cousin of actor Ashok Kumar's wife Shobha Ganguly, thus related to the Ganguly family.

See also
 Bachchan Family
 Bengali actors
 Bengali film directors
 Bengali singers

Footnotes

Bollywood film clans
Indian families
Hindu families
Bengali families
Bengali male actors
Bengali musicians

Hindi-language film directors
Indian male playback singers
Bengali film producers
Brahmos
Bengali Hindus